Parameioneta is a genus of Asian dwarf spiders that was first described by G. H. Locket in 1982.

Species
 it contains eight species:
Parameioneta bilobata Li & Zhu, 1993 – China, Vietnam
Parameioneta bishou Zhao & Li, 2014 – China, Thailand
Parameioneta javaensis Tanasevitch, 2020 – Indonesia (Java)
Parameioneta multifida Zhao & Li, 2014 – China
Parameioneta spicata Locket, 1982 (type) – Thailand, Malaysia
Parameioneta sulawesi (Tanasevitch, 2012) – Indonesia (Sulawesi)
Parameioneta tricolorata Zhao & Li, 2014 – China
Parameioneta yongjing Yin, 2012 – China

See also
 List of Linyphiidae species (I–P)

References

Araneomorphae genera
Linyphiidae
Spiders of Asia